The 1999 Indian general election in Jammu and Kashmir to the 13th Lok Sabha were held for 6 seats. Jammu and Kashmir National Conference won 4 seats and Bharatiya Janata Party won 2 seats.

Constituency Details

Results

Party-wise Results

List of Elected MPs

See also 

 Results of the 2004 Indian general election by state
 Elections in Jammu and Kashmir

References 

Jammu
1999
1999